This is a list of Danish television related events from 1984.

Events
18 February - Hot Eyes are selected to represent Denmark at the 1984 Eurovision Song Contest with their song "Det' lige det". They are selected to be the seventeenth Danish Eurovision entry during Dansk Melodi Grand Prix held at the DR Studios in Copenhagen.

Debuts

Television shows

Births
5 February - Sarah Grünewald, model, TV host & actress
21 July - Said Chayesteh, Iran-born actor

Deaths

See also
1985 in Denmark